

History 
LIHI is rooted in a commitment to advocacy for low-income and homeless people. LIHI's early emphases were providing advocacy and technical assistance to promote the interests of low-income and homeless people. LIHI worked to support the efforts of homeless individuals who established an emergency shelter in a "bus barn" at the Seattle Center in 1990. The result of this effort was the development of the 57-unit Aloha Inn, the first self-managed transitional housing program in the country for homeless people. This was followed shortly after by the renovation of Arion Court, which provides 37 units of permanent self-managed housing for homeless people.

The Aloha Inn and Arion Court were, at their inception, revolutionary concepts for implementing democratic decision-making and self-governance among traditionally disenfranchised populations. Principles of mutual housing, or self-management, now guide many of LIHI's properties—equipping residents with opportunities for meaningful decision-making and shared responsibility for the management of their housing.

Incorporation
The incorporation of LIHI as an organization in 1991 resulted from the leadership of three founding board members: Frank Chopp of the Fremont Public Association, Michael Reichert of Catholic Community Services, and Scott Morrow of SHARE. LIHI filled a void in the community for creating self-management and developing innovative housing solutions.

The Fremont Public Association merged its Housing Development Department with LIHI in 1994 to create a dedicated housing development and management organization. LIHI became an affiliated program of FPA, and Sharon Lee was named the Executive Director. As of 2018 Ms. Lee makes over $200,000 in yearly compensation.

Service area
The Low Income Housing Institute serves the Puget Sound region of Western Washington. LIHI programs serve homeless and low-income people in Snohomish, King, Island, Kitsap, Pierce and Thurston Counties. LIHI housing serves communities in Seattle, Lynnwood, Lacey, Olympia, Tacoma, Bremerton, and smaller towns throughout the region.

Properties 
At the end of 2015, LIHI owned and/or managed over 1,700 housing units at 50 sites in six counties throughout the Puget Sound region. Residents include the working poor, low-income families, individuals, seniors, people with disabilities, and women and children at risk.  More than 700 of these units house formerly homeless families and individuals. Approximately 200 housing units serve individuals who are disabled or require attention for special needs such as mental illness, alcohol and drug abuse, developmental disabilities or HIV/AIDS and related illnesses. 240 units serve senior citizens. 75% of our housing units serve families or individuals earning less than 30 percent of the area median income. The remaining 25% earn between 30% and 60% of the area median income.

Various housing projects are targeted to specific populations. For example, Cate Apartments in the Greenwood-Phinney neighborhood of Seattle provides transitional housing for homeless families and for the working poor. Greenwood House in Crown Hill is home to adult women transitioning from the street.  Arbor Manor in Lacey, WA serves single mothers with young children.

In 2017, LIHI joined with Walsh Construction to build a village of tiny homes, each one measuring 120 square feet.

Support services 

LIHI also provides a variety of supportive services to help residents maintain their housing and develop self-sufficiency. These services include providing residents with case management, life skills training, technology access and training, financial literacy training and savings programs, and activities for some of the more than 850 children in LIHI housing.

In order to increase the housing stability and long-term self-sufficiency of our residents, LIHI's Support Services Department provides intensive case management and resource coordination for individuals and families living in transitional housing. Case managers assist clients with accessing needed social service support, healthcare, counseling, education and job training, childcare, and a variety of other services and resources to overcome the barriers they face in securing long-term self-sufficiency.

LIHI also provides short-term resource coordination to families and individuals living in permanent housing to assist with episodic, short-term challenges that may threaten their housing stability. Assistance provided by the RC includes helping residents in accessing rent, utility and food assistance; providing referrals and advocacy for child care, Head Start and Department of Social and Health Services; helping immigrant residents untangle cultural misunderstandings; providing mental health referrals and interim counseling; and providing active intervention in crisis situations.

In addition to these invaluable services, LIHI is developing further strategies for increasing the self-sufficiency of low-income families and individuals. LIHI employs a multifaceted approach toward increasing opportunities and services, including:

Offering on-site life skills workshops for homeless and formerly homeless families;
Bringing youth programs to several housing sites, including after school tutoring, a summer activity day program, children's art and poetry classes, anti-bullying/conflict resolution workshops, and a youth leadership program;
Presenting financial literacy and asset building workshops, in which families are encouraged to save money and participate in financial education programs;
Increasing access to technology.

Urban Rest Stop 

LIHI also runs the Urban Rest Stop (URS), a hygiene facility for homeless individuals and families located in downtown Seattle. The URS is a clean, safe and dignified environment that has 5 private shower rooms, 9 washer and 13 dryer units, and a large men's and women's restroom. Patrons receive free toiletries, such as toothbrushes, toothpaste, disposable razors, shaving cream, shampoo and soap. The URS is designed to serve a wide range of people including homeless people, disabled people, veterans, adults, families with children and the elderly. As of December 2, 2015 the URS had served 36,361 (unduplicated) patrons since its opening, providing over 714,684 showers and 318,116 loads of laundry.

Housing Washington 

Housing Washington is a statewide newsletter published quarterly and distributed by LIHI. Housing Washington focuses on the politics and events surrounding affordable housing in Washington state. LIHI staff and a wide range of experts write articles on federal, state and local policy, current events and grassroots activities in the affordable housing arena. Housing Washington is distributed to over 5,000 organizations and individuals each quarter.

References

External links 
 Low Income Housing Institute home page
 Urban Rest Stop home page
 Housing Washington Newsletter

Non-profit organizations based in Seattle
1991 establishments in Washington (state)
Affordable housing
Community organizations
Housing organizations in the United States
Organizations established in 1991